Billbergia microlepis is a species of flowering plant in the genus Billbergia. This species is endemic to Bolivia.

References 

microlepis
Flora of Bolivia